This is a list of U.S. states by credit rating, showing credit ratings for sovereign bonds as reported by the three major credit rating agencies: Standard & Poor's, Fitch and Moody's. The list is given as of May 2021.

List of general obligation bond rankings

Historic S&P Global Rankings

See also
 List of U.S. state budgets
 List of countries by credit rating
 Illinois pension crisis

References 

Credit rating
credit rating
Credit rating